= Marigeri =

Coordinates: 15°35′N 74°50′E

- Village
- Interactive map of Marigeri
- Country: India
- State: Karnataka
- District: Belgaum

Languages
  - Official: Kannada
- Time zone: UTC+5:30 (IST)

Marigeri is a village in Belgaum district of Karnataka, India.
